LTAN may refer to:

 Konya Airport (ICAO:LTAN)
 Local time of the ascending node, an orbital element